Touma may refer to:

Surname 
 Aida Touma-Suleiman, (born 1964), Israeli Arab journalist and politician
 Carlos Abumohor Touma, Chilean businessman and investor
 Emile Touma, political historian and philosopher and thinker
 Habib Hassan Touma, (1934–1998), Palestinian composer and ethnomusicologist
 Sharbel Touma, Lebanese-born Swedish footballer
 Travis Touma, Lebanese international rugby league footballer
 Yumi Touma, Japanese singer and voice actor
 Ziad Touma, Lebanese Canadian film director

Fictional characters 
 Touma H. Norstein, from the anime series Digimon Data Squad 
 Touma Kamijou, from the anime series To Aru Majutsu no Index
 Touma Yoimachi, from the tokusatsu series Kaitou Sentai Lupinranger VS Keisatsu Sentai Patranger

Places 
 Bab Touma, a borough of Old Damascus in Syria
 Dongol-Touma, a town and subprefecture in Guinea